Johnny Farnham Sings the Big Hits of '73 Live! is a live album by Australian singer John Farnham.

Track listing
Side A
 "I Knew Jesus (Before He Was a Star)" (Neal Hefti, Seymore Styne)
 "Where Is the Love?" (Lionel Bart)
 "Baby, Don't Get Hooked on Me" (Mac Davis)	
 "Gilbert O'Sullivan Medley"  ("Clair"/"Doo Wakka Doo Wakka Day"/"Alone Again (Naturally)") 

Side B	
 "Your Are the Sunshine of My Life"	
 "Nothing Rhymed"	(O'Sullivan)
 "Tie a Yellow Ribbon Around the Old Oak Tree" (Irwin Levine, L. Russell Brown)
 "The Morning After"	
 "And I Love You So" (Don McLean)	
 "Free Electric Band" (Albert Hammond, Mike Hazlewood)

Charts

References 

John Farnham live albums
1973 live albums
Albums produced by Peter Dawkins (musician)